The Kazakh Soviet Encyclopedia (Qazaq Sovet Entsıklopedııasy) was a multi-purpose encyclopedia of Kazakhstan issued in the Soviet Union. Kazakh Soviet Encyclopedia was printed in 12 volumes in Almaty from 1972 to 1978. An additional 4 volume, Kazakh SSR, was published in both Kazakh and Russian in 1985.

See also
Great Soviet Encyclopedia

Soviet culture
Kazakh Soviet Socialist Republic
1972 non-fiction books
Kazakh encyclopedias
20th-century encyclopedias
National Soviet encyclopedias